The following is a List of overseas trips made by Willem-Alexander, King of the Netherlands since he ascended to the Dutch throne in April 2013 following the abdication of Beatrix that year.

List of visits

References 

Netherlands, Willem-Alexander
Willem-Alexander of the Netherlands
Netherlands, Willem-Alexander
Diplomatic visits by Willem-Alexander